Karijärv is a lake in Estonia.

See also
List of lakes of Estonia

Lakes of Estonia
Elva Parish
Lakes of Tartu County